The 1994 Italian motorcycle Grand Prix was the eighth race of the 1994 Grand Prix motorcycle racing season. It took place on 3 July 1994 at the Mugello Circuit.

500 cc classification

250 cc classification

 Nobuatsu Aoki suffered a shoulder injury in a crash during practice and withdrew from the event.

125 cc classification

 Yoshiaki Katoh suffered a kneecap injury in a crash during practice and withdrew from the event.

References

Italian motorcycle Grand Prix
Italian
Motorcycle Grand Prix